The Maxwell-Briscoe Automobile Company Showroom is a historic automobile showroom located at 1737 S. Michigan Avenue in Chicago's Motor Row District. The showroom was built in 1909 for the Maxwell-Briscoe Motor Company, which was founded in 1904 by Jonathan D. Maxwell and Benjamin Briscoe. William Ernest Walker, a Chicago architect who specialized in large-scale commercial buildings, designed the showroom. The four-story building is divided by brick piers; the ground floor features large plate-glass windows designed to showcase the company's automobiles, while the upper floors feature banks of double-hung and triple-hung windows between the piers. The building uses terra cotta extensively for decoration; a terra cotta stringcourse encircles the building above the first floor, terra cotta pediments and sills frame the window banks, and a terra cotta frieze runs below the roof line. Maxwell and Briscoe used the building as a showroom until 1915; it is one of the oldest surviving auto showrooms on Motor Row.

The showroom was added to the National Register of Historic Places on November 18, 2002.

References

Commercial buildings on the National Register of Historic Places in Chicago
Commercial buildings completed in 1909
Auto dealerships on the National Register of Historic Places
Historic district contributing properties in Illinois